IROC at Indy was an auto race held at the Indianapolis Motor Speedway, from 1998 through 2003, as a support race to the Brickyard 400.  It was part of the International Race of Champions series, and served as the season finale each of the six years it was run.

In March 1992, IROC drivers Dave Marcis and Dick Trickle were invited to test at the Speedway.  At the time, the Speedway was considering hosting an IROC event during the month of May, during activities leading up the Indianapolis 500.  The test was considered successful, but several improvements would have to be made to the track before it was safe for modern stock cars to race there. After consideration, it was determined that it would not be economically feasible to hold an IROC race at the time, and plans for that event were put on hold. Instead, the Speedway moved forward on plans to host a NASCAR race, the Brickyard 400, which would debut in 1994.

After the Brickyard 400 was deemed to be a huge success, and since the sufficient track improvements had been made, the Speedway re-opened talks to bring an IROC to Indy. The event was held for the first time in 1998.

As with all IROC races, there were no qualification sessions held.  Grid positions were determined on a handicap basis, with starting positions opposite to the current points standings. All cars were identically prepared stock cars, based upon the Pontiac Trans Am.  The cars were prepared and serviced by the series, rather than by a team which employed the driver.

By winning the IROC event from 1998–2000, Mark Martin became the first driver to "three-peat" any single annual event at the Indianapolis Motor Speedway.

Due to dwindling interest, the IROC race was removed from the IMS schedule after 2003 and, following the 2006 season, the IROC series itself folded.

Race results

Event records

Drivers

In the six years that this race was contested, 38 drivers participated:

References
IROC website (Website is inactive.  Preserved on archive.org)
2004 Brickyard 400 Official Program, Indianapolis Motor Speedway, 2004.

Auto races in the United States
Motorsport in Indianapolis
Indy